"Yes" is the debut single of English music duo McAlmont & Butler, released on 15 May 1995 and later included on their debut album, The Sound Of... McAlmont & Butler. The soul ballad was their first UK hit, peaking at number eight on the UK Singles Chart, and remains their most successful single, selling over 200,000 copies in the United Kingdom to earn a silver sales certification. The song also charted in Ireland, reaching number 24, and in New Zealand, peaking at number 40. British magazine NME ranked the song at number 174 on its list of the "500 Greatest Songs of All Time" in 2014.

Background
Both David McAlmont and Bernard Butler had departed from their previous bands in acrimonious circumstances shortly before the release—McAlmont from Thieves; Butler from Suede. Utilising the Wall of Sound technique, the lyrics of the song are a thinly disguised attack on their former colleagues. In 2013 Bernard Butler spoke to NME about the song's genesis:

Critical reception
Reviewing the song is his weekly UK chart column, James Masterton wrote that McAlmont "sings like an angel" and described the song as "the most utterly wonderful records you have heard in ages". In a retrospective review, Patrick Corcoran of music website Albumism called McAlmont's vocal performance on the song "incredible" and noted that "Yes" is "perhaps, one of the most joyously uplifting songs of all time". In 2014, NME ranked the song at number 174 on its list of the "500 Greatest Songs of All Time".

Track listings
UK CD1 and European CD single
 "Yes" (edit) – 4:00
 "Don't Call It Soul" – 3:56
 "How About You?" – 5:49

UK CD2
 "Yes" (full version) – 4:53
 "What's the Excuse This Time?" – 5:07
 "Disappointment" – 7:32

UK cassette single
 "Yes" (edit) – 4:00
 "Don't Call It Soul" – 3:56
 Another UK cassette was issued including "How About You?" as a bonus track.

Credits and personnel
Credits are taken from the UK CD1 liner notes.

Studio
 Engineered at Chateau de la Rouge Motte (Normandy, France)

Personnel

 David McAlmont – writing, vocals
 Bernard Butler – writing, guitars, "things", string arrangement, production
 Makoto Sakamoto – drums
 Gini Ball – violin
 Jote Osahn – violin
 Anne Stephenson – violin
 Johnny Taylor – violin
 Claire Orsler – viola
 Joss Pook – viola
 Billy McGhee – string arrangement
 Mike Hedges – production
 Ian Grimble – engineering

Charts

Sales and certifications

References

1990s ballads
1995 songs
1995 debut singles
Hut Records singles
Song recordings produced by Mike Hedges
Song recordings with Wall of Sound arrangements
Songs written by Bernard Butler
Songs written by David McAlmont
Soul ballads